Dieter Vieweger, a German Biblical scholar and Prehistorian Archaeologist, was born in Chemnitz, East Germany in 1958.

He studied Theology (Old Testament Studies) and Prehistoric Archaeology in Leipzig and Frankfurt on Main. He then held a number of distinguished research and educational positions.

Career to date
 1989–1991 professorship (Old Testament Studies) Kirchliche Hochschule Berlin.
 1991–1993 professorship Humboldt University of Berlin.
 since 1993 full professorship at the "Kirchliche Hochschule Wuppertal" (Old Testament Studies and Biblical archaeology).
 since 1999 Director of the Biblical Archaeological Institute Wuppertal.
 since 2002 also research-professorship for Archaeology at the Witten/Herdecke University.
 since 2005 Director-General of the German Protestant Institute of Archaeology Jerusalem and Amman, Research Unit of the German Archaeological Institute.
 since 2005 Deputy provost in Jerusalem and coordinator of the German Protestant education in the Holy City.
 Since 2005, he has been dividing his duties between Germany  and the German Protestant Institutes in Jerusalem and Amman.
 2009 he received an Honorary degree (Dr. h.c.) of the University of Wuppertal, Faculty of Philosophy.
 Visiting professor at summer universities of the Studienstiftung des deutschen Volkes in the years 1997, 2000, 2003, 2008 (German National Academic Foundation).
 Visiting professor at the Dormition Abbey, Jerusalem, for Biblical Archaeology in the years 2004, 2006, 2007, 2008, and 2009.

Education
From 1976 to 1981, Vieweger studied Protestant theology at the University of Leipzig, where he received his doctorate (Dr. theol.) in 1985. From 1986 to 1989, he was parish priest at the St. Thomas Church, Leipzig, church of Johann Sebastian Bach's choir Thomanerchor, and in 1987, he received his ordination at the St. Thomas Church. In 1989, he received his habilitation (Dr. theol. habil.) at the University of Leipzig. From 1994 to 1998, he studied prehistoric archaeology at the University of Frankfurt, and received his doctorate (Dr. phil.) there in 1998.

Excavation projects
 1992 Survey at Maschana (Jordan)
 1995–1996 Tell el-Oreme ('Oreimeh) (Israel)
 1998–1999 Esch-Schallaf (Jordan)
 1999 Ba'ja I, near Petra (Jordan)
 1999–2000 Sal (Jordan)

Since 2001 he has run the Gadara Region Project. This project has focused on the interdisciplinary investigation of the Wadi al-'Arab south-west of Gadara and the excavation of its most prominent site, Tall Zira'a. Since 2003, the more-than-5000-year-old fascinating history of Palestine has been excavated there.

Memberships
 since 1992 confidant of the Studienstiftung des deutschen Volkes;
 1992–2005 member of the council of the German Protestant Institute of the Exploration of the Holy Land;
 since 2005 member of the board of trustees for the Zeitschrift für Orientarchäologie (former Baghdader Mitteilungen and Damaszener Mitteilungen) at the German Archaeological Institute (DAI), Berlin;
 since 2006 Senior Fellow of the Albright Institute, Jerusalem.
 since 2007/2009 member of the German Archaeological Institute (since 2009 “Ordentliches Mitglied”).

Journals/books
 1994–2008 editor: Zeitschrift des Deutschen Palästina-Vereins and Abhandlungen des Deutschen Palästina-Vereins;
 Die Spezifik der Berufungsberichte Jeremias und Ezechiels im Umfeld ähnlicher Einheiten des Alten Testaments.  Lang: Frankfurt a. M., Bern, New York 1986, 
 Die literarischen Beziehungen zwischen den Büchern Jeremia und Ezechiel.  Lang: Frankfurt a. M., Bern, New York 1993, 
 Zur Chronologie der Nekropole von Tamassos-Lambertis, Zypern. Dissertationsschrift Johann Wolfgang Goethe Universität Frankfurt a. M. 1998.
 Proseminar Altes Testament. Ein Arbeitsbuch. (with Siegfried Kreuzer) 2nd edition Stuttgart 2005, 
 Archäologie der Biblischen Welt. UTB-Taschenbuch 2394, 2nd edition Göttingen 2006. 
 Wenn Steine reden. Archäologie in Palästina. Göttingen 2004. 
 Das Geheimnis des Tells. Eine archäologische Reise in den Orient. (with Friederike Rave und Claudia Voigt) Zabern: Mainz 2005,   (for children).
 2010 Streit um das Heilige Land. Was jeder vom israelisch-palästinensischen Konflikt wissen sollte. 2nd edition Gütersloh 2010,

External links
 Homepage Gadara Region Project and Tall Zira'a
 Homepage BAI Wuppertal
 Homepage GPIA, Jerusalem and Amman
 Homepage of the children's book The mystery of the Tall Zira'a

Archaeologists from Saxony
Prehistorians
German biblical scholars
Leipzig University alumni
Goethe University Frankfurt alumni
Academic staff of the University of Wuppertal
People from Chemnitz
1958 births
Living people
Officers Crosses of the Order of Merit of the Federal Republic of Germany